Robla Elementary School District is a public school district in Sacramento County, California, United States.

References

External links
 

School districts in Sacramento County, California